The 2003 Buffalo Bills season was their 44th in the league. The team failed to improve upon their previous season's output of 8–8, and finished at 6–10. The team missed the playoffs for the fourth consecutive season.

The Bills started the season strong, opening the season with a dominating 31–0 blowout of the New England Patriots (They would not win another game against the Patriots until 2011). This was a revenge game for newly-signed safety Lawyer Milloy, who had been cut by New England a few days earlier. It was their largest margin of victory in a season opener since 1992, and their first regular-season shutout in four years. The Bills' second game was a convincing three-touchdown win over the Jacksonville Jaguars. But Buffalo lost seven of their next nine games and finished the season with three consecutive losses. The Bills' final game of the season was a 31–0 shutout loss to the New England Patriots – the complete reverse of the score by which the Bills beat New England in Week One.

Head coach Gregg Williams' contract was not renewed after the 2003 season.

Van Miller, the team's longtime play-by-play announcer, announced his retirement after week 2 of the season; his retirement took effect at the end of the season.

Offseason

Free Agency 
The Bills bolstered their defense by signing former Oakland Raiders defensive tackle Sam Adams, former Denver Broncos safety Izell Reese, former Houston Texans linebacker Jeff Posey and former Cincinnati Bengals linebacker Takeo Spikes during the offseason.

The Bills also traded for tight end Mark Campbell and signed kicker Rian Lindell during the offseason.

During the preseason, the Bills signed Lawyer Milloy after he was released by the New England Patriots.

NFL Draft 

The Bills traded away their first pick in the 2003 draft (#14 overall) to the New England Patriots for Drew Bledsoe in the previous draft. They obtained their first pick (#23 overall) from the Atlanta Falcons in exchange for Peerless Price.

Roster

Schedule

Season summary

Week 1 

 Source: Pro-Football-Reference.com

Week 2 

 Drew Bledsoe 19/25, 314 Yds
 Eric Moulds 7 Rec, 133 Yds

Standings

References 

Buffalo Bills seasons
Buffalo Bills
Buff